The Chinese Ambassador to Nepal is the official representative of the People's Republic of China to the Federal Democratic Republic of Nepal.

List of representatives

References 

 
Nepal
China